The Church of La Asunción (Spanish: Iglesia Parroquial de La Asunción) is a church located in Brea de Tajo, Spain. It was declared Bien de Interés Cultural in 1997.

References 

Asuncion, Brea de Tajo
Bien de Interés Cultural landmarks in the Community of Madrid